Gürdal is a name

Surname
Gamze Gürdal, European champion Para Taekwondo
Kemal Arda Gürdal (born 1990), Turkish swimmer
Macit Gürdal, Turkish footballer
Michèle Gurdal (born 1952), Belgian tennis player

Given name
Gürdal Duyar (1935–2004), Turkish sculptor
Gürdal Tosun (1967–2000), Turkish actor

Names
Turkish-language surnames
Turkish masculine given names